The 1991–92 season for Ipswich Town saw the team compete in the final season of the former Second Division, before it was renamed the First Division the following season. Ipswich Town won the league to become one of the forming teams for the new Premier League that was contested from the 1992–93 season onwards.

Season summary
John Lyall began his second season as Ipswich manager by watching his team draw 3–3 at Bristol Rovers on the opening day of the Second Division campaign. Three successive wins followed, ensuring that Ipswich finished August as leaders of the Second Division. 

However, an eight-match winless run left Ipswich's promotion hopes fading by the middle of November. A 2–1 win at Wolves ended the long wait for victory, and Ipswich Town back in the heat of the race for automatic promotion to the new FA Premier League. They were up against big-spending clubs Blackburn Rovers and Derby County in the race for promotion, but also found themselves with some surprise rivals in the race in the shape of their distant local rivals Cambridge United and Southend United. 

By the end of April, Ipswich had sealed promotion to the new Premier League and clinched the Second Division title, ending their six-year absence from the top flight. The season ended with a 3–1 home win over doomed Brighton.

First-team squad
Squad at end of season

Left club during season

Reserve squad

Pre-season
During their pre-season travels, Ipswich travelled to Finland to face Rips Riihimaki, Kemin Palloseura and Kontulan Uheilsat where Ipswich were defeated in their opening two matches but managed to win their last. Ipswich returned to England to face Lincoln City, Peterborough United and  Scunthorpe United which saw the Tractor Boys draw against Lincoln and Peterborough but were defeated when up against Scunthorpe.

Friendlies

Legend

Competitions

Football League Second Division

League table

Legend

Ipswich Town's score comes first

Matches

FA Cup

League Cup

Full Members Cup

Transfers

Transfers in

Loans in

Transfers out

Loans out

Awards

Player awards

PFA First Division Team of the Year

References

Ipswich Town F.C. seasons
Ipswich